Wolfpit Branch is a  long first-order tributary to Sullivan Branch in Caroline County, Maryland.

Course

Watershed
Wolfpit Branch drains  of area, receives about 44.6 in/year of precipitation, and is about 17.92% forested.

See also
List of Maryland rivers

References

Rivers of Maryland
Rivers of Caroline County, Maryland
Tributaries of the Nanticoke River